John Duncan Anderson  (born 1938) is a New Zealand businessman, author and celebrity speaker.  He is  the founder of the travel and leisure company Contiki Tours. The company is now owned by Trafalgar Tours, itself a division of The Travel Corporation

Personal life
Anderson was born in Wellington, New Zealand in 1938. He is married to Ali (Alison), a passenger who fell ill on one of Contiki's first tours.  They have four children.

Anderson's parents divorced when he was five years old; he was raised primarily by his mother although maintained a good relationship with his father, a dentist who emigrated to England when he was a child.

Anderson emigrated to England in 1961, returning to New Zealand in 1979 with a wife and family.  He lived in Auckland for many years and currently lives in Blenheim, Marlborough.

In the 2012 New Year Honours, Anderson was appointed a Member of the New Zealand Order of Merit for services to tourism.

Overseas experience
In 1960 Anderson travelled to London, England where his father was living.  Anderson planned his route to England to include many stopovers en route.  As the president of his local Jaycees association, Anderson contacted fellow presidents in the cities that he planned and received many offers to host him.  In this way, Anderson was able to defray his travel costs considerably.

In his book Only Two Seats Left Anderson describes his travels with a mixture of awe and sense of adventure.  This was Anderson's first travel outside of New Zealand which at that time had a population of just over 2 million.

The first tours
Arriving in England in 1962, Anderson set about planning a trip to see Europe however had only £25 to his name Anderson came up with the idea of advertising for 11 other young Australasians to join him on the trip.  He worked out the total costs for the trip and then divided by 11, thus providing a free seat for himself.

The trip sold quickly, assisted by Anderson meeting prospective fellow travellers and exaggerating his experience of Europe.  In fact, his only previous experience of Europe was an overnight trip to Paris.  Shortly after having sold all the seats, Anderson was approached by two more prospective passengers.  Anderson decided to take advantage of the interest and advertise a second tour to operate following the first.  This second tour also sold well and sold out before the first tour departed.

Despite Anderson's inexperience the tour was a success.  Anderson admitted his lack of European knowledge to his customers on the first day.  After that, he and the eleven others shared duties and decision making, including driving duties in the 12 seater Commer van they christened Tiki after the Maori good luck charm

For the second tour Anderson had increased the price from £100 to £115 per person.  Despite this, upon arrival in Monaco Anderson found he had nearly run out of money and would be unable to complete the advertised itinerary.  Anderson worked out the amount of money that he would need to express the group directly back to England and took the remaining funds to a casino where he gambled on the roulette tables.  He won and was able to continue the tour without his customers finding out.

Contiki Holidays
The trips which had begun as an exercise to fund his own travels around Europe became a fast-growing business; fleet and staff grew rapidly and a number of new tours were developed under the name Tiki Tours, in recognition of the company's first vehicle.

When the New Zealand Tourist Board challenged Anderson over his use of the name Tiki Tours he changed the company's name to Contiki, the con coming from The Continent.

Contiki grew to include tours worldwide.  During the 1980s the company began to diversify from its roots as a tour company for 18- to 35-year-olds (originally 19 to 29).  Examples included building hotel resorts in Queenstown and in the Great Barrier Reef, and the purchase of Fullers Ferries.

By the mid 1980s Contiki was a global organisation headquartered in Hong Kong.  Anderson was living in New Zealand and travelled frequently for directors meetings and to review the company's operations.

Sale of Contiki
In the early 1980s Anderson sold down his investment in Contiki, allowing fellow directors to invest as shareholders.  In 1985 Omnicorp, a company controlled by Lloyd Morrison purchased a 50% stake in the business.

The stock market crash of 1987 devalued many of Contiki's assets.  This, along with the poor performance of recent acquisitions, notably Fullers Ferries, placed Anderson in financial difficulty. In 1989 he was forced to sell his remaining shares in Contiki as well as his family home to avoid bankruptcy.

After Contiki
During the early 1990s Anderson was employed to sell off the assets of former Contiki empire.  His wife Ali returned to full-time work to supplement their income.  They briefly owned and ran a chain of stores in Auckland selling packaged sandwiches.  The business was short-lived and they moved to Blenheim in the late 1990s. Along with Contours Travel, John has started tours to South America for 'baby boomers'.

Public speaking
In recent years Anderson has taken up public speaking as a profession and has presented his Contiki story to many businesses.

Only Two Seats Left
In 2010 Anderson published Only Two Seats Left, an autobiography that focuses mainly on his time with Contiki from 1961 to 1989.

References

External links 
 Only Two Seats Left

1938 births
Living people
New Zealand businesspeople
Members of the New Zealand Order of Merit
People from Wellington City
New Zealand expatriates in the United Kingdom